Czajki may refer to the following places:
Czajki, Lublin Voivodeship (east Poland)
Czajki, Masovian Voivodeship (east-central Poland)
Czajki, Podlaskie Voivodeship (north-east Poland)
Czajki, Greater Poland Voivodeship (west-central Poland)